Frederick Albert Sargent (7 March 1912 – 22 August 1948) was an English professional footballer who played for Northfleet United, Tottenham Hotspur and Chelmsford City.

Sargent was a right winger who played for Tottenham Hotspur between 1934–1935 making 109 appearances (93 league and 16 F.A. Cup) and scored 31 goals  for the club. From the 1945–46 season he played for Chelmsford City. Sargent died in 1948 and a testimonial match was played on 20 September that year at the Chelmsford's New Writtle Street stadium between the two clubs he had played for.

References 

1912 births
1948 deaths
Footballers from Islington (district)
English footballers
Association football wingers
English Football League players
Tufnell Park F.C. players
Tottenham Hotspur F.C. players
Northfleet United F.C. players
Chelmsford City F.C. players